Edsall may refer to:

Edsall (surname), a list of people so named
Edsall Walker (1910-1997), American pitcher in Negro league baseball 
Edsall-class destroyer escort, a class of US Navy ships built for World War II 
 , the lead ship of the class, in commission from 1943 to 1946
 , a destroyer in commission from 1920 to 1942

See also
Edsel (disambiguation)
Wilson C. Edsell (1814-1900), American politician, lawyer and banker